Kinky may refer to:

 Kinky (band), an electronic rock act from Monterrey, Mexico
 Kinky (Kinky album), their self-titled album
 Kinky (Hoodoo Gurus album)
 "Kinky", by Kesha from the album High Road
 Kink (sexuality), having unconventional sexual desire(s)
 Kinky Friedman, American singer, novelist and Texas politician
 Kinky Island, an island in Alaska
 MC Kinky, raggamuffin toaster
 Kinky (film), a 2018 American film
 Kinky, a term used to refer to afro-textured hair.

See also
 Kink (disambiguation)
 Kinki (disambiguation)
 The Quinquis of Spain.